Undoing Ruin is the fourth full-length studio album by melodic death metal/metalcore band Darkest Hour, released on June 28, 2005.

It was the band's first album to enter the Billboard 200 albums chart, debuting at #138. "Convalescence" served as the album's single with a music video that was frequently shown on MTV2's Headbangers Ball.

Darkest Hour released an official DVD in 2017 titled 'Party Scars and Prison Bars Two and a Half: Live' as a bonus bundled with pre-orders of their ninth studio album Godless Prophets & the Migrant Flora of the band playing Undoing Ruin live in its entirety, which was filmed in 2015 to celebrate the tenth anniversary of the album's release.  It was only limited to 1100 copies.

Track listing

Personnel
 John Henry – vocals, additional drums
 Kris Norris  – lead guitar, acoustic guitar
 Mike Schleibaum – rhythm guitar
 Paul Burnette – bass
 Ryan Parrish – drums

References

2005 albums
Darkest Hour (band) albums
Victory Records albums
Albums produced by Devin Townsend